This is a list of retired naval ships operated by the Hellenic Navy during its history.

Capital ships

Battleships 

s

  (1914–1931) – The ex- was in Greek service named after the Battle of Kilkis-Lahanas, hulk sunk by German aircraft in 1941
  (1914–1932) – The ex- was in Greek service named after the Naval Battle of Lemnos, hulk sunk by German aircraft in 1941

  (1914) Taken over by Germany 1914, not completed – BU 1923
  A  ordered in 1913 but not completed due to the outbreak of World War I – BU 1914

Ironclads 

s

  (1889–1918)
  (1889–circa 1920)
  (1890–1920)

  (1867)
  (1869)

Ships of the line 

 Emmanouil (1824, ex-Russian Emmanuil, purchased in 1830) – BU 1832–1833

Coastal patrol boats 

 A5 class patrol/customs vessels, two built by the Lavrion Shipyards (1930-1941)

Three Delos-class (Abeking) air rescue patrol boats.
 Delos (P267) ΑΝΣ Δήλος (1978–1999) Transferred to the Georgian Navy
 Knosos (P268) ΑΝΣ Κνωσσός (1978–2000) Transferred to the Navy of the Republic of Cyprus
 Lindos (P269) ΑΝΣ Λίνδος (1978–1998) Transferred to the Georgian Navy

Two Goulandris class (Neorion shipyards).
 Goulandris I (P289) (1975–1990)
 Goulandris II (P290) (1977–1983), destroyed in an accident

Two Panagopoulos class (Hellenic shipyards HSY).
 Panagopoulos II (P70) (1975–2003)
 Panagopoulos III (P96) (1975–2003)

Corvettes

s 

  (1943–1952) The ex- saw action during World War II in the Mediterranean
  (1944–1952) The ex- during World War II participated in convoy operations and in Normandy Landings (June 1944)
  (1942–1952) The ex- saw action during World War II in the Mediterranean
 Tombazis (1944–1952) The ex-HMS Tamarisk during World War II participated in Atlantic Ocean convoy operations, in the Normandy Landings (June 1944) and in Southern France Landings (August 1944)

Sail corvettes 

 Hydra (1830–1831) Burned along with the frigate  and the corvette Spetsai
  (1838–1873) Renamed Messolongion in 1862, not operationally utilized due to its size (used as a training ship since 1846)
 Psara (1830–1833) Renamed Prinkips Maximilianos (1833–1836) after Prince Maximilian of Bavaria
 Spetsai, officially Island of Spetsai (1830–1831) The ex-Agamemnon, owned by Lascarina Bouboulina, and sold to the Hellenic Navy

Steam corvettes 

  (1826–1831)

Cruisers

Armoured cruisers 

  (1909 – today) – A  armored cruiser (the only ship of this type still in existence), she served as the flagship of the Hellenic Royal Navy during the Balkan Wars, World War I and World War II, now a floating museum at Palaio Faliro. The ship, although currently a hulk, is still commissioned, has a skeleton naval crew and flies the ensign, jack and commission standard.

Light cruisers 

  (1914–1940) – Built as the Fei Hung for China, taken over by Greece in 1914, sunk during peacetime by an Italian submarine
  (1951–1965) – The ex-, was given as war reparation for the original Elli to Greece after the Second World War

Sail cruisers 
  (1879–1931)

Destroyers

s 

  (1992–2002) – The ex-, named after Phormio
  (1991–2004) – The ex-, named after Kimon
  (1992–2003) – The ex-, named after Nearchus
  (1992–2002) – The ex-, named after Themistocles

s 

  (1959–1991) – The ex-
  (1960–1990) – The ex-
  (1962–1981) – The ex-
  (1959–1992) – The ex-
  (1962–1981) – The ex-
  (1959–1991) – The ex- is preserved at Faliron Bay (Marina Floisvou) as HS Velos – museum of the struggle against dictatorship (1967–1974)

s 

  (1933–1941)
  (1933–1946)
  (1933–1941)
  (1933–1946)

s

FRAM I type 

  (1980–1992) – The ex-, named after the admiral of Psara during the Greek Revolution
  (1972–1993) – The ex-, named after admiral and multiple Prime Minister Konstantinos Kanaris
  (1973–1994) – The ex-, named after the admiral and later President of Greece, Pavlos Kountouriotis
  (1980–1993) – The ex-, named after the Admiral and Prime Minister of Greece (1849–1854), Antonios Kriezis
  (1974–1992) – The ex-
  (1976–1997) – The ex-, named after Iakovos Tombazis, an Admiral of Hydra during the Greek Revolution

FRAM II type 

  (1971–1992) – The ex-, named after Admiral Andreas Miaoulis
  (1970–1992) – The ex-, named after Themistocles

German V-class destroyers 

  (1912–1919)
  (1912–1919)

s 

  (1950–1971). Ex-
  (1950–1972). Ex-

s 

  (1946–1963) – The ex- was acquired on loan as a replacement for the first Adrias (L67). She was returned to the Royal Navy in 1963.
  (1942–1945) – The ex- was seriously damaged by mines on October 22, 1943. Although the ship survived, it was not fully repaired and was decommissioned in 1945.
  (1946–1959) – The ex-
 Astings (1946–1963) – The ex-HMS Catterick, named after Frank Abney Hastings
  (1942–1959) – The ex-
  (1943–1959) – The ex-
  (1942–1959) – The ex-
  (1942–1959) – The ex-
  (1942–1959) – The ex-

Modified G-class destroyers 

  (1938–1943)
 Vasilefs Konstantinos (Scheduled, not constructed due to outbreak of World War II)
  (1938–1943)
 Vasilissa Sofia (Scheduled, not constructed due to outbreak of World War II)

s 

  (1906–1945)
  (1907–1945)
  (1906–1917)
  (1907–1926)

Rhein-class destroyer tenders 

 Aigaion (D03) (1976–1991) – The ex-Weser (A62)

destroyers 

  (1912–1945)
  (1912–1946)
  (1912–1941)
  (1912–1946)

s 

  (1907–1941)
  (1907–1926)
  (1906–1921)
  (1907–1945)

destroyers/s 

  (1951–1991) – The ex- was used extensively as a training ship. She is preserved as Museum ship USS Slater at Hudson River, Albany, NY.
  (1951–1991) – The ex- was used as a target and sunk in July 2000
  (1951–1992) – The ex- was sold for scrap (2000)
  (1951–1992) – The ex- was used as a target and sunk in the Sea of Crete in September 2000

Electronic surveillance ships 

  (1988–2002) Ex-German Navy (class 422) fleet service vessel Oker (A53) (1961–1988) The former 1500 tn trawler Hoheweg, converted to an electronic surveillance ship by the German Navy in 1961 and sold to Greece in 1988

Fleet support ships 

 Evros A415 (1976–2009), Ex-German Navy Schwarzwald (A1400). A 2500 tonnes ammunition ship built by Dibigeon Shipyard, Nantes, France. Armed with two 40 mm twin Bofors guns. Decommissioned on April 2, 2009.

Frigates

s/s 

 Bouboulina (F463) (ex- Commissioned on 14 December 2001, decommissioned on 18 February 2013

s 
Leased to Greece from the USN after the Gulf War

  (1992–2003) – The ex- was in Greek service until 2003, named after the region of Epirus
  (1992–1998) – The ex- was in Greek service, named after the region of Macedonia
  (1992–2001) – The ex- was in Greek service, named after the region of Thrace

Sail frigates 

  Purchased during the Revolution from the United States (1826–1831)

Steam frigates 

 Amalia (1860) 26 guns

Guided missile boats

Kostakos (P25) (1980–1996) Sunk on November 4, 1996, at Avlakia, off Samos Island, after being rammed by F/B Samaina, with loss of 4 crew members. She was salvaged on May 15, 1997, but was never repaired and recommissioned.

Anninos (P14) (1972–2002), ex-HS Navsithoi (P56)
 Arliotis (P15) (1972–2002), ex-HS Evniki (P55)
 Batsis (P17)  (1972–2004), ex-HS Kalypso (P54) The ship was transferred to the Georgian Navy and renamed Dioskuria. It was severely damaged in the 2008 South Ossetia war and afterwards scuttled by the Russians.
 Konidis (P16) (1972–2003), ex-HS Kymothoi (P53)
 Sakipis (P77) (2000–2011), ex-German Navy Leopard (P6145)
 Tournas (P76) (2000–2011), ex-German Navy Jaguar (P6147)
 Vlahavas (P74) (1995–2011), ex-German Navy Marder (P6144)

Gunboats

s 
Formerly German Navy Class 420 or Thetis submarine hunters (U-Jagdboote).

 Agon (P66) (1993–2004), ex-Theseus (P6056) Used as target and sunk with 2 Penguin missiles by PCFG Kavaloudis in Cretan Sea on October 21, 2008
 Doxa (P63) (1991–2010), ex-Najade (P6054)
 Eleftheria (P64) (1992–2010), ex-Triton (P6055)
 Karteria (P65) (1992–2004), ex-Hermes (P6053)
 Niki (P62) (1991–2009), ex-Thetis, (P6052)

Landing ships

Dock landing ships (LSD) 

 Nafkratousa (1953) (1953–1971), ex-HMS Eastway
  (1971–2000), ex-

Landing craft (LCT) 
Twelve WW II British landing craft (LCT) were transferred on loan to the Royal Hellenic Navy in 1945/1946. They were used for military transport and also for civilian transport due to the poor state of the railway system. Four were returned to the UK in 1953. The remaining were sold in 1963, with the exception of Kythira and Milos.

 Anafi
 Kandanos
 Kommeno (1945–1953)
 Kythira (L185). Ex RN LCT-1198. Kythira remained in use as a naval personnel transport until the 2000s
 Malakassi (1945–1953)
 Milos (L189). Ex RN LCT-1300. Milos remained in use as a naval personnel transport until the 2000s
 Paleochori (1945–1953)
 Serifos
 Sofades
 Thira
 Vrachni (1945–1953)

Tank carriers (LST) 

Eight former United States Navy LST Mark 2.
  (1943–1977), ex-
 Ikaria (L154) (1960–1998), ex-USS Potter County (LST-1086)
 Kriti (L171) (1971–1999), ex-
  (1943–1977), ex-USS LST-36
 Lesvos (L172) (1960–1990), ex-USS Boone County (LST-389) HS Lesvos was involved in combat action in Cyprus on July 20, 1974 (CO Lt Cdr E. Handrinos, HN). She was in the Paphos area on a scheduled mission, carrying replacement personnel to the ELDYK, the permanent Greek military force based in Cyprus. There she attacked the Turkish Cypriot garrison of Paphos with her 40 mm gun and forced them to surrender
 Rodos (L157) (1960–1990), ex-USS Bowman County (LST-391)
  (1943–1977), ex-USS LST-33
 Syros (L144) (1964–1999), ex- Currently preserved in Evansville, Indiana, as the USS LST Ship Memorial Museum

Six former Royal Navy LST Mark 3.
 Acheloos (1947–1964), ex-HMS LST 3503
 Alfeios (1947–1962), ex-HMS LST 3020
 Aliakmon (1947–1964), ex-
 Axios (1947–1962), ex-HMS LST 3007
 Pineios (1947–1964), ex-HMS LST 3506
 Strymon (1947–1962), ex-HMS LST 3502

Two former United States Navy s.
  (1977–2001), ex- Used as a target and sank during Thyella III/2004 naval exercise
  (1977–2003), ex- Used as a target and sank north of Crete, on 2007-10-04

Vehicle carriers (LSM-1) 

 Ypoploiarchos Daniolos (L163) (1958–1993)
  (1958–1993), ex-
 Ypoploiarchos Krystallidis (L165) (1958–2000), ex-LSM-541
 Ypoploiarchos Merlin (L166) (1958–1972), ex-LSM-557 On November 15, 1972, she sunk 3 nm off Piraeus harbour after a collision with VLCC tanker World Hero (IMO 7033915), with the loss of 44 crew members
 Ypoploiarchos Roussen (L164) (1958–2001), ex-LSM-399
 Ypoploiarchos Tournas (L162) (1958–1990)

Minehunters (Castagno class) 

 Erato (M60) (1995–2006), ex-IS Castagno, M-5504 Used as target and sunk in Cretan Sea on October 22, 2008
 Evniki (Μ61) (1995–2005), ex-IS Gelso, M-5509

Minelayers 

 Aktion (Ν04) (1953–2000), ex-LSM-301
 Amvrakia (Ν05) (1953–2002), ex-LSM-303

Minesweepers 

Algerine Class (225-foot), transferred in 1948
 Armatolos (M12), ex-HMS Aries (J284), ex-USS AM-327
 Navmachos (M64), ex-HMS Lightfoot (J288), ex-USS AM-331
 Polemistis (M74), ex-HMS Gozo (J287), ex-USS AM-330
 Pyrpolitis (M76), ex-HMS Arcturus (J283), ex-USS AM-326

BYMS Class (136-foot), transferred between 1943 and 1948
 Afroessa, ex-HMS BYMS-2185 (J985), ex USS YMS-185
 Andromeda, ex-HMS BYMS-2261 (J1061), ex-USS YMS-261
 Ariadne, ex-HMS BYMS-2058 (J858), ex-USS BYMS-58
 Aura, ex-HMS BYMS-2054 (J854), ex-USS BYMS-54
 Ithiki, ex-HMS BYMS-2240 (J1040), ex-USS YMS-210
 Kalymnos, ex-HMS BYMS-2033 (J833), ex-USS BYMS-33
 Karteria, ex-HMS BYMS-2065 (J865), ex-USS BYMS-65
 Kassos, ex-HMS BYMS-2074 (J874), ex-USS BYMS-74
 Keffalinia, ex-HMS BYMS-2171 (J971), ex-USS BYMS-171
 Kerkyra, ex-HMS BYMS-2172 (J972), ex-USS YMS-172
 Klio, ex-HMS BYMS-2152 (J952), ex-USS YMS-152
 Kos, ex-HMS BYMS 2191 (J991), ex-USS YMS191
 Lambadias, ex-HMS BYMS-2182 (J982), ex-USS YMS-182
 Lefkas, ex-HMS BYMS-2068 (J868), ex-USS BYMS-68
 Leros, ex-HMS BYMS-2186 (J986), ex-USS YMS-186
 Paralos, ex HMS BYMS-2066 (J866), ex-USS BYMS-66
 Patmos, ex-HMS BYMS-2229 (J1029), ex-USS YMS-229
 Paxi, ex-HMS BYMS-2056 (J856), ex-USS BYMS-56
 Pigassos, ex-HMS BYMS-2221 (J1021), ex-USS YMS-221
 Prokyon, ex-HMS BYMS-2076 (J876), ex-USS BYMS-76
 Salamina, ex-HMS BYMS-2067 (J867), ex-USS BYMS-67
 Symi, ex-HMS BYMS-2190 (J990), ex-USS YMS-190
 Thalia, ex-HMS BYMS-2252 (J1052), ex-USS YMS-252
 Vegas, ex-HMS BYMS-2078 (J878), ex-USS BYMS-78
 Zakynthos, ex-HMS BYMS-2209 (J1009), ex-USS YMS-209

MMS Class (119-foot), transferred in 1946
 Andros, ex-HMS MMS-310 (J810)
 Argyrokastron, ex-HMS MMS-58 (J558)
 Chimarra, ex-HMS MMS-1 (J501)
 Korytsa, ex-HMS MMS-53 (J553)
 Mikonos, ex-HMS MMS-5 (J505)
 Tepeleni, ex-HMS MMS-46 (J546)
 Tinos, ex-HMS MMS-144 (J644)
 Syros, ex-HMS MMS-313 (J813)

MSC Class
 Klio (M213) (1968–2006), ex-USS MSC-317 Originally named Argo (M213) in Greek service. Used as a target and sunk in Cretan Sea on April 30, 2009 with Exocet missiles launched by HS Kavaloudis (P24) and HS Xenos (P27).
 Dafni (Μ247) (1964–2004), ex-USS MSC-307
 Kissa (M242) (1964–2010), ex-USS MSC-309
 Thalia (Μ210) (1969–2004), ex-USS MSC-170, ex-Belgian Navy Blankenberge (M923)

Motor launches 

Fifteen Fairmile B Motor Launches, transferred in 1945-47
 Doliana, ex-HMS ML-295
 Domokos, ex-HMS ML-232
 Doxoton, ex-HMS ML-307
 Drama, ex-HMS ML-341
 Elefteron, ex-HMS ML-478
 Kalambaka, ex-HMS ML-483
 Karpathos, ex-HMS ML-561
 Karpenissi, ex-HMS ML-867
 Kassos, ex-HMS ML-534
 Kastellorizon, ex-HMS ML-840
 Khalki, ex-HMS ML-578
 Kos, ex-HMS ML-565
 Nissiros, ex-HMS ML-864
 Tilos, ex-HMS ML-569
 Tsataltza, ex-HMS ML-861

Eight Admiralty Harbour Defence Motor Launches, transferred in 1945-47
 Bizani, ex-HMS HDML-1221 (ML-1221)
 Davlia, ex-HMS HDML-1032 (ML-1032)
 Distratron, ex-HMS HDML-1292 (ML-1292)
 Farsala, ex-HMS HDML-1252 (ML-1252)
 Karia, ex-HMS HDML-1307 (ML-1307)
 Kastraki, ex-HMS HDML-1375 (ML-1375)
 Klissoura, ex-HMS HDML-1149 (ML-1149)
 Portaria, ex-HMS HDML-1051 (ML-1051)

Oil tankers 

2  tankers.
 Arethousa (A377) (1959–2004), ex- After decommissioning she was used as a target and sunk off Crete Island in 2005
 Ariadne (A414) (1959–2003), ex-

Others 

 Hermes (A324) A 550-ton minesweeper tender (1946–1973) formerly the British trawler Port Jackson on loan from the Royal Navy
 Mount Othrys Named after Mount Othrys
 Sotir (A384), ex-RFA Salventure A -class salvage vessel, built by William Simons & Co (Renfrew) and equipped with a decompression chamber. Ships of this class had a displacement of 1780 tons and measured 65.4 m in length, 11.3 m in beam with a 3.9 m draught. They were powered by a triple-expansion, 6-cylinder 1500 hp reciprocating steam engine with two shafts and had a speed of 12 knots. She was commissioned in the Royal Hellenic Navy on May 5, 1947, on loan from the Royal Navy and decommissioned on April 24, 1976. Sold for scrap on behalf of the British Government in 1978. The ship was used during the post-war salvage of a number of wrecks in Salamis Naval Base and other port facilities in Greece.
 SS Korinthia The former liner Oranje Nassau of the Royal Dutch Line. Built in 1911 by Royal Schelde, Flashing. Bought in 1939 by Aktoploia Ellados and renamed Corinthia. Requisitioned by the Royal Hellenic Navy in 1940 and used as a troopship. During the Axis occupation of Greece she was based in Alexandria, Egypt and used as a submarine tender. After the war she returned to passenger services in the fleet of Hellenic Mediterranean Lines until 1955. She was scrapped in 1959.
 Steamer Maximilianos (1837–1846) The first steamship built in Greece (Poros Naval shipyard). An unarmed 180 ton paddle steamer used as a royal yacht and for mail services. Out of service due to engine problems after 1841.
 Steamer Othon (1838–1864) Greece's first "modern" military ship, built in Poros Naval shipyard. Powered by two 120 hp steam engines and armed with two 18 lb long guns and four 32 lb carronades.
 Tilemachos Named after Telemachus
 Coastal transports Velestinon (ex-HMS FT-11, ex-USS APc-65), Elasson (ex-HMS FT-12, ex-USS APc-66), Kalavrita (ex-HMS FT-13, ex-USS APc-71), Distomon (ex-HMS FT-15, ex-USS APc-75), Lehovon (ex-HMS FT-24, ex-USS APc-67), and Anchialos (ex-HMS FT-28, ex-USS APc-73)

Submarines

s 

  (1965–1980) – The ex-
  (1972–1992) The ex-, GUPPY (Greater Underwater Propulsion Power Program) IIA type

s 

  (1958–1967) – The ex-
  (1957–1976) – The ex-

Glafkos class submarines (Type 209-1100) 

 Glafkos (S110) (1971–2011) – First Type 209 vessel to be built and become operational

s 
Built in France in 1925–1927.

  (1928–1943) Named after Lambros Katsonis
  (1927–1945) Her sail is preserved at the Hellenic Maritime Museum in Piraeus

s 

  (1942–1945) The ex-Italian , was captured by the British Royal Navy and transferred to Greece. Named after the naval hero of the Greek Revolution, Georgios Matrozos.

Pre–World War I submarines 

  (1912–1920) – The first submarine in history to launch a torpedo attack, during the First Balkan War
 Gryparis
 Nordenfelt I – The first submarine designed by Thorsten Nordenfelt. It was a 56-tonne, 19.5-metre-long vessel similar to George Garrett's ill-fated Resurgam II of 1879, with a range of 240 km and armed with a single torpedo and a 25.4 mm machine gun. She was manufactured by Bolinders in Stockholm in 1884–1885. She operated on the surface using a 100 hp steam engine with a maximum speed of 9 knots, then she shut down the engine to dive. She was purchased by the Greek Government, was shipped to Greece in parts and assembled by the Ifaistos machine works in Piraeus; she was delivered to Salamis Naval Base in 1886. Following the acceptance tests, she was never used again by the Hellenic Navy and was scrapped in 1901.
 Vuteas
  (1913–1920)

s 
Built in France in 1927–1930.

 Protefs (Υ3) (1929–1940) Named after the marine god Proteus
 Nirefs (Υ4) (1930–1947) Named after the marine god Nereus
 Triton (Υ5) (1930–1942) Named after the marine god Triton
 Glafkos (Υ6) (1930–1942) Named after the marine god Glaucus

s 

  (1973–1993) – The ex-, GUPPY III type

U-class submarines 
Under lease from the United Kingdom.

  (1945–1952) – The ex-
  (1945–1952) – The ex-

V-class submarines 
Under lease from Britain.

 Pipinos (Υ8) (1943–1959) Named after the naval hero of the Greek Revolution, Andreas Pipinos
  (1945–1957) Formerly HMS Vengeful P86
 Triaina (Υ14) (1946–1958)
  (1946–1958)

Torpedo boats

Alkyoni-class torpedo boats 

 Alkyoni (1914–1941)
 Aigli (1914–1941)
 Arethousa (1914–1941)
 Dafni (1914–1926)
 Doris (1914–1941)
 Thetis (1914–1926)

Antalya-class torpedo boats 
Ottoman torpedo boats, scuttled in Preveza in 1912 during the First Balkan War, later salvaged by Greece.

 Nikopolis (1913–1916), ex-Ottoman Antalya
 Tatoi (1913–1916), ex-Ottoman Tokat

Esperos class torpedo boats 
Seven former German Navy Type 141 torpedo boats. Four Esperos class torpedo boats (Esperos, Kyklon, Lelaps, Typhon) were sold in public auction on May 18, 2009.

 Esperos, P50 (1977–2004) Ex-P-196, formerly German Navy P-6068 Seeadler
 Lailaps, P54 (1977–2004) Ex-P-228, formerly German Navy P-6070 Kondor
 Kataigis, P197 (1976–1981) Formerly German Navy P-6072 Falke
 Kentavros, P52 (1977–1995) Ex-P-198, formerly German Navy P-6075 Habicht
 Kyklon, P53 (1976–2005) Ex-P-199, formerly German Navy P-6071 Greif
 Skorpios, P55 (1977–1995) Ex-P-229, formerly German Navy P-6077 Kormoran
 Typhon, P56 (1976–2005) Ex-P-230, formerly German Navy P-6073 Geier

The remaining three boats of the class (P-6069 Albatros, P-6074 Bussard and P-6076 Sperber) were also transferred to the Hellenic Navy and used as sources for spare parts.

Kydonia-class torpedo boats 
These ships were transferred to Greece from Austria-Hungary as war reparations for World War I.

  (1920–1941)
  (1920–1941)
  (1920–1941)
  (1919–1928)
  (1919–1941)
  (1919–1941)

Training ships 

 Aigli (M246) (1995–2008), ex-USS MSC-299 A former minesweeper (1965–1995), she was used after 1995 as a training ship by HN Naval Training Command. Decommissioned on 19 November 2008, she remained in storage at Souda Bay until 18 November 2009, when she was used as a target for a MM-38 Exocet missile.
 Aris (A74) (1979–2004) Former training ship, mainly used by the Hellenic Naval Academy and capable of being used as a hospital ship in time of war, build by Salamis Shipyards. The ship had displacement 2400/2630 tonnes, length 100 m, beam 14.7 m and draught 4.5 m. It had a diesel powerplant of 10,000 hp and two shafts. It was armed with a 3 in gun, two Boffors 40 mm/70 guns and four Rheinmetall 20 mm anti-aircraft gus. There was accommodation for 370 cadet officers (midshipmen). After decommissioning (2004) she is moored at Naval Dock Crete, Souda Bay and used by NATO Maritime Interdiction Operations Training Center (NMIOTC) as a training facility.

Tugboats 

 Aegefs (A438), a 57-ton tug, formerly of the German Navy, commissioned in 1993, decommissioned on 30 November 2009
 Iraklis (A423), built by Anastasiadis-Iordanidis shipyard in Perama, commissioned on 6 April 1978, decommissioned on 30 November 2009
 K1 Titan I (88), built in Salamis naval shipyard in 1937 and destroyed in 1944
 Pilefs (A413), a 57-ton tug, formerly of the German Navy, commissioned in 1993, decommissioned on 30 November 2009

See also 

List of active Hellenic Navy ships

References

Further reading 

 

Greece
Ships, decommissioned
Ships of the Hellenic Navy
Ships